In iron and steel metallurgy, ledeburite is a mixture of 4.3% carbon in iron and is a eutectic mixture of austenite and cementite. Ledeburite is not a type of steel as the carbon level is too high although it may occur as a separate constituent in some high carbon steels. It is mostly found with cementite or pearlite in a range of cast irons.

It is named after the metallurgist Karl Heinrich Adolf Ledebur (1837–1906). He was the first professor of metallurgy at the Bergakademie Freiberg and discovered ledeburite in 1882.

Ledeburite arises when the carbon content is between 2.06% and 6.67%. The eutectic mixture of austenite and cementite is 4.3% carbon, Fe3C:2Fe, with a melting point of 1147 °C.

Ledeburite-II (at ambient temperature) is composed of cementite-I with recrystallized secondary cementite (which separates from austenite as the metal cools) and (with slow cooling) of pearlite. The pearlite results from the eutectoidal decay of the austenite that comes from the ledeburite-I at 723 °C. During more rapid cooling, bainite can develop instead of pearlite, and with very rapid cooling martensite can develop.

External links
Names and Steel
Karl Heinrich Adolf Ledebur (in German)
Rostfreier Edelstahl (in German)

Metallurgy
Ferrous alloys